The naxar (co-spelled nakhar or nahar) is the currency that Chechen separatists planned for the Chechen Republic of Ichkeria.

In 1994, in the UK, banknotes were printed in denominations of 1, 3, 5, 10, 20, 50, 100, 500, and 1000 naxar, dated 1995.

This currency was not put into circulation, and almost all printed banknotes stored in bank of Grozny were destroyed by the Russian military.

If the naxar would keep on existing, it would be worth 5 dollars.

References

Chechen Republic of Ichkeria
North Caucasus
Currencies of Europe
Proposed currencies